This list of birds of Nevada includes species documented in the U.S. state of Nevada and accepted by the Nevada Bird Records Committee (NBRC). As of March 2021, there are 491 species and two species pairs included in the official list. Of them, 108 are on the review list (see below) and six  have been introduced to North America.

This list is presented in the taxonomic sequence of the Check-list of North and Middle American Birds, 7th edition through the 62nd Supplement, published by the American Ornithological Society (AOS). Common and scientific names are also those of the Check-list, except that the common names of families are from the Clements taxonomy because the AOS list does not include them.

Unless otherwise noted, all species listed below are considered to occur regularly in Nevada as permanent residents, summer or winter visitors, or migrants. These tags are used to annotate some species:

 (R) Review list - birds that if seen require more comprehensive documentation than regularly seen species. These birds are considered irregular or rare in Nevada.
(I) Introduced - a species established in North America as a result of human action

Ducks, geese, and waterfowl

Order: AnseriformesFamily: Anatidae

The family Anatidae includes the ducks and most duck-like waterfowl, such as geese and swans. These birds are adapted to an aquatic existence with webbed feet, bills which are flattened to a greater or lesser extent, and feathers that are excellent at shedding water due to special oils. Thirty-nine species have been recorded in Nevada.

Black-bellied whistling-duck, Dendrocygna autumnalis (R)
Fulvous whistling-duck, Dendrocygna bicolor (R)
Snow goose, Anser caerulescens
Ross's goose, Anser rossii
Greater white-fronted goose, Anser albifrons
Brant, Branta bernicla
Cackling goose, Branta hutchinsii
Canada goose, Branta canadensis
Trumpeter swan, Cygnus buccinator 
Tundra swan, Cygnus columbianus
Wood duck, Aix sponsa
Blue-winged teal, Spatula discors
Cinnamon teal, Spatula cyanoptera
Northern shoveler, Spatula clypeata
Gadwall, Mareca strepera
Eurasian wigeon, Mareca penelope
American wigeon, Mareca americana
Mallard, Anas platyrhynchos
Mexican duck, Anas diazi 
Northern pintail, Anas acuta
Green-winged teal, Anas crecca
Canvasback, Aythya valisineria
Redhead, Aythya americana
Ring-necked duck, Aythya collaris
Greater scaup, Aythya marila
Lesser scaup, Aythya affinis
King eider, Somateria spectabilis (R)
Harlequin duck, Histrionicus histrionicus (R)
Surf scoter, Melanitta perspicillata
White-winged scoter, Melanitta deglandi
Black scoter, Melanitta americana
Long-tailed duck, Clangula hyemalis
Bufflehead, Bucephala albeola
Common goldeneye, Bucephala clangula
Barrow's goldeneye, Bucephala islandica
Hooded merganser, Lophodytes cucullatus
Common merganser, Mergus merganser
Red-breasted merganser, Mergus serrator
Ruddy duck, Oxyura jamaicensis

New World quail
Order: GalliformesFamily: Odontophoridae

The New World quails are small, plump terrestrial birds only distantly related to the quails of the Old World, but named for their similar appearance and habits. Three species have been recorded in Nevada.

Mountain quail,  Callipepla pictus
California quail, Callipepla californica
Gambel's quail, Callipepla gambelii

Pheasants, grouse, and allies
Order: GalliformesFamily: Phasianidae

Phasianidae consists of the pheasants and their allies. These are terrestrial species, variable in size but generally plump with broad relatively short wings. Many species are gamebirds or have been domesticated as a food source for humans. Ten species have been recorded in Nevada.

Wild turkey, Meleagris gallopavo
Ruffed grouse, Bonasa umbellus
Greater sage-grouse, Centrocercus urophasianus
Dusky grouse, Dendragapus obscurus
Sooty grouse, Dendragapus fuliginosus
Sharp-tailed grouse, Tympanuchus phasianellus
Gray partridge, Perdix perdix (I)
Ring-necked pheasant, Phasianus colchicus (I)
Himalayan snowcock, Tetraogallus himalayensis (I)
Chukar, Alectoris chukar (I)

Grebes
Order: PodicipediformesFamily: Podicipedidae

Grebes are small to medium-large freshwater diving birds. They have lobed toes and are excellent swimmers and divers. However, they have their feet placed far back on the body, making them quite ungainly on land. Six species have been recorded in Nevada.

Pied-billed grebe, Podilymbus podiceps
Horned grebe, Podiceps auritus
Red-necked grebe, Podiceps grisegena
Eared grebe, Podiceps nigricollis
Western grebe, Aechmorphorus occidentalis
Clark's grebe, Aechmorphorus clarkii

Pigeons and doves
Order: ColumbiformesFamily: Columbidae

Pigeons and doves are stout-bodied birds with short necks and short slender bills with a fleshy cere. Eight species have been recorded in Nevada.

Rock pigeon, Columba livia
Band-tailed pigeon, Patagioenas fasciata
Eurasian collared-dove, Streptopelia decaocto
Inca dove, Columbina inca
Common ground dove, Columbina passerina
Ruddy ground dove, Columbina talpacoti (R)
White-winged dove, Zenaida asiatica
Mourning dove, Zenaida macroura

Cuckoos
Order: CuculiformesFamily: Cuculidae

The family Cuculidae includes cuckoos, roadrunners, and anis. These birds are of variable size with slender bodies, long tails, and strong legs. Three species have been recorded in Nevada.

Groove-billed ani, Crotophaga sulcirostris (R)
Greater roadrunner, Geococcyx californianus
Yellow-billed cuckoo, Coccyzus americanus

Nightjars and allies
Order: CaprimulgiformesFamily: Caprimulgidae

Nightjars are medium-sized nocturnal birds that usually nest on the ground. They have long wings, short legs, and very short bills. Most have small feet, of little use for walking, and long pointed wings. Their soft plumage is cryptically colored to resemble bark or leaves. Five species have been recorded in Nevada.

Lesser nighthawk,  Chordeiles acutipennis
Common nighthawk,  Chordeiles minor
Common poorwill,  Phalaenoptilus nuttallii
Chuck-will's-widow, Antrostomus carolinensis (R)
Mexican whip-poor-will, Antrostomus arizonae

Swifts
Order: ApodiformesFamily: Apodidae

The swifts are small birds which spend the majority of their lives flying. These birds have very short legs and never settle voluntarily on the ground, perching instead only on vertical surfaces. Many swifts have very long, swept-back wings which resemble a crescent or boomerang. Three species have been recorded in Nevada.

Black swift, Cypseloides niger (R)
Vaux's swift, Chaetura vauxi
White-throated swift, Aeronautes saxatalis

Hummingbirds
Order: ApodiformesFamily: Trochilidae

Hummingbirds are small birds capable of hovering in mid-air due to the rapid flapping of their wings. They are the only birds that can fly backwards. Nine species have been recorded in Nevada.

Rivoli's hummingbird, Eugenes fulgens (R)
Ruby-throated hummingbird, Archilochus colubris (R)
Black-chinned hummingbird, Archilochus alexandri
Anna's hummingbird, Calypte anna
Costa's hummingbird, Calypte costae
Calliope hummingbird, Selasphorus calliope
Rufous hummingbird, Selasphorus rufus
Broad-tailed hummingbird, Selasphorus platycercus
Broad-billed hummingbird, Cynanthus latirostris (R)

Rails, gallinules, and coots

Order: GruiformesFamily: Rallidae

Rallidae is a large family of small to medium-sized birds which includes the rails, crakes, coots, and gallinules. The most typical family members occupy dense vegetation in damp environments near lakes, swamps, or rivers. In general they are shy and secretive birds, making them difficult to observe. Most species have strong legs and long toes which are well adapted to soft uneven surfaces. They tend to have short, rounded wings and tend to be weak fliers. Seven species have been recorded in Nevada.

Ridgway's rail, Rallus obsoletus
Virginia rail, Rallus limicola
Sora, Porzana carolina
Common gallinule, Gallinula galeata
American coot, Fulica americana
Purple gallinule, Porphyrio martinicus (R)
Black rail, Laterallus jamaicensis (R)

Cranes
Order: GruiformesFamily: Gruidae

Cranes are large, long-legged, and long-necked birds. Unlike the similar-looking but unrelated herons, cranes fly with necks outstretched, not pulled back. Most have elaborate and noisy courting displays or "dances". Two species have been recorded in Nevada.

Sandhill crane, Antigone canadensis
Common crane, Grus grus (R)

Stilts and avocets
Order: CharadriiformesFamily: Recurvirostridae

Recurvirostridae is a family of large wading birds which includes the avocets and stilts. The avocets have long legs and long up-curved bills. The stilts have extremely long legs and long, thin, straight bills. Two species have been recorded in Nevada.

Black-necked stilt, Himantopus mexicanus
American avocet, Recurvirostra americana

Plovers and lapwings

Order: CharadriiformesFamily: Charadriidae

The family Charadriidae includes the plovers, dotterels, and lapwings. They are small to medium-sized birds with compact bodies, short thick necks, and long, usually pointed, wings. They are found in open country worldwide, mostly in habitats near water. Seven species have been recorded in Nevada.

Black-bellied plover, Pluvialis squatarola
American golden-plover, Pluvialis dominica
Pacific golden-plover, Pluvialis fulva (R)
Killdeer, Charadrius vociferus
Semipalmated plover, Charadrius semipalmatus
Snowy plover, Charadrius nivosus
Mountain plover, Charadrius montanus

Sandpipers and allies
Order: CharadriiformesFamily: Scolopacidae

Scolopacidae is a large diverse family of small to medium-sized shorebirds including the sandpipers, curlews, godwits, shanks, tattlers, woodcocks, snipes, dowitchers, and phalaropes. The majority of these species eat small invertebrates picked out of the mud or soil. Different lengths of legs and bills enable multiple species to feed in the same habitat, particularly on the coast, without direct competition for food. Thirty-five species have been recorded in Nevada.

Upland sandpiper, Bartramia longicauda (R)
Whimbrel, Numenius phaeopus
Long-billed curlew, Numenius americanus
Hudsonian godwit, Limosa haemastica (R)
Marbled godwit, Limosa fedoa
Ruddy turnstone, Arenaria interpres
Black turnstone, Arenaria melanocephala (R)
Red knot, Calidris canutus
Ruff, Calidris pugnax (R)
Sharp-tailed sandpiper, Calidris acuminata (R)
Stilt sandpiper, Calidris himantopus
Curlew sandpiper, Calidris ferruginea (R)
Red-necked stint, Calidris ruficollis (R)
Sanderling, Calidris alba
Dunlin, Calidris alpina
Baird's sandpiper, Calidris bairdii
Least sandpiper, Calidris minutilla
White-rumped sandpiper, Calidris fuscicollis (R)
Buff-breasted sandpiper, Calidris subruficollis (R)
Pectoral sandpiper, Calidris melanotos
Semipalmated sandpiper, Calidris pusilla
Western sandpiper, Calidris mauri
Short-billed dowitcher, Limnodromus griseus
Long-billed dowitcher, Limnodromus scolopaceus
American woodcock, Scolopax minor (R)
Wilson's snipe, Gallinago delicata
Spotted sandpiper, Actitis macularius
Solitary sandpiper, Tringa solitaria
Lesser yellowlegs, Tringa flavipes
Willet, Tringa semipalmata
Spotted redshank, Tringa erythropus (R)
Greater yellowlegs, Tringa melanoleuca
Wilson's phalarope, Phalaropus tricolor
Red-necked phalarope, Phalaropus lobatus
Red phalarope, Phalaropus fulicarius

Skuas and jaegers
Order: CharadriiformesFamily: Stercorariidae

Skuas and jaegers are in general medium to large birds, typically with gray or brown plumage, often with white markings on the wings. They have longish bills with hooked tips and webbed feet with sharp claws. They look like large dark gulls, but have a fleshy cere above the upper mandible. They are strong, acrobatic fliers. Three species have been recorded in Nevada.

Pomarine jaeger, Stercorarius pomarinus (R)
Parasitic jaeger, Stercorarius parasiticus
Long-tailed jaeger, Stercorarius longicaudus

Auks, murres, and puffins
Order: CharadriiformesFamily: Alcidae

The family Alcidae includes auks, murres, and puffins. These are short-winged birds that live on the open sea and normally only come ashore for breeding. One species has been recorded in Nevada.

Ancient murrelet, Synthliboarmphus antiquus (R)

Gulls, terns, and skimmers

Order: CharadriiformesFamily: Laridae

Laridae is a family of medium to large seabirds and includes  gulls, terns, kittiwakes, and skimmers. They are typically gray or white, often with black markings on the head or wings. They have stout, longish bills and webbed feet. Twenty-five species and a species pair have been recorded in Nevada.

Black-legged kittiwake, Rissa tridactyla
Red-legged kittiwake, Rissa brevirostris (R)
Sabine's gull, Xema sabini
Bonaparte's gull, Chroicocephalus philadelphia
Little gull, Hydrocoloeus minutus (R)
Laughing gull, Leucophaeus atricilla (R)
Franklin's gull,  Leucophaeus pipixcan
Heermann's gull, Larus heermanni
Common gull/short-billed gull, Larus canus/Larus brachyrhynchus
Ring-billed gull, Larus delawarensis
Western gull, Larus occidentalis (R)
Yellow-footed gull, Larus livens (R)
California gull, Larus californicus
Herring gull, Larus argentatus
Iceland gull, Larus glaucoides
Lesser black-backed gull, Larus fuscus
Slaty-backed gull, Larus schistisagus (R)
Glaucous-winged gull, Larus glaucescens
Glaucous gull, Larus hyperboreus
Least tern, Sternula antillarum
Caspian tern, Hydroprogne caspia
Black tern, Chlidonias niger
Common tern, Sterna hirundo
Arctic tern, Sterna paradisaea
Forster's tern, Sterna forsteri
Black skimmer, Rynchops niger (R)

Loons
Order: GaviiformesFamily: Gaviidae

Loons are aquatic birds the size of a large duck, to which they are unrelated. Their plumage is largely gray or black, and they have spear-shaped bills. Loons swim well and fly adequately, but are almost hopeless on land, because their legs are placed towards the rear of the body. Four species have been recorded in Nevada.

Red-throated loon, Gavia stellata
Pacific loon, Gavia pacifica
Common loon, Gavia immer
Yellow-billed loon, Gavia adamsii

Northern storm-petrels
Order: ProcellariiformesFamily: Hydrobatidae

The storm-petrels are the smallest seabirds, relatives of the petrels, feeding on planktonic crustaceans and small fish picked from the surface, typically while hovering. The flight is fluttering and sometimes bat-like. One species has been recorded in Nevada.

Least storm-petrel, Hydrobates microsoma (R)

Storks
Order: CiconiiformesFamily: Ciconiidae

Storks are large, heavy, long-legged, long-necked wading birds with long stout bills and wide wingspans. They lack the powder down that other wading birds such as herons, spoonbills, and ibises use to clean off fish slime. Storks lack a pharynx and are mute. One species has been recorded in Nevada.

Wood stork, Mycteria americana (R)

Frigatebirds
Order: SuliformesFamily: Fregatidae

Frigatebirds are large seabirds usually found over tropical oceans. They are large, black, or black-and-white, with long wings and deeply forked tails. The males have colored inflatable throat pouches. They do not swim or walk and cannot take off from a flat surface. Having the largest wingspan-to-body-weight ratio of any bird, they are essentially aerial, able to stay aloft for more than a week. One species has been recorded in Nevada.

Magnificent frigatebird, Fregata magnificens (R)

Boobies and gannets
Order: SuliformesFamily: Sulidae

The sulids comprise the gannets and boobies. Both groups are medium-large coastal seabirds that plunge-dive for fish. Two species have been recorded in Nevada.

Blue-footed booby, Sula nebouxii (R)
Brown booby, Sula leucogaster (R)

Cormorants and shags
Order: SuliformesFamily: Phalacrocoracidae

Cormorants are medium-to-large aquatic birds, usually with mainly dark plumage and areas of colored skin on the face. The bill is long, thin, and sharply hooked. Their feet are four-toed and webbed. Two species have been recorded in Nevada.

Double-crested cormorant, Nannopterum auritum
Neotropic cormorant, Nannopterum brasilianum

Pelicans
Order: PelecaniformesFamily: Pelecanidae

Pelicans are very large water birds with a distinctive pouch under their beak. Like other birds in the order Pelecaniformes, they have four webbed toes. Two species have been recorded in Nevada.

American white pelican, Pelecanus erythrorhynchos
Brown pelican, Pelecanus occidentalis

Herons, egrets, and bitterns
Order: PelecaniformesFamily: Ardeidae

The family Ardeidae contains the herons, egrets, and bitterns. Herons and egrets are medium to large wading birds with long necks and legs. Bitterns tend to be shorter necked and more secretive. Members of Ardeidae fly with their necks retracted, unlike other long-necked birds such as storks, ibises, and spoonbills. Twelve species have been recorded in Nevada.

American bittern, Botaurus lentiginosus
Least bittern, Ixobrychus exilis
Great blue heron, Ardea herodias
Great egret, Ardea alba
Snowy egret, Egretta thula
Little blue heron, Egretta caerulea (R)
Tricolored heron, Egretta tricolor (R)
Reddish egret, Egretta rufescens (R)
Cattle egret, Bubulcus ibis
Green heron, Butorides virescens
Black-crowned night-heron, Nycticorax nycticorax
Yellow-crowned night-heron, Nyctanassa violacea (R)

Ibises and spoonbills
Order: PelecaniformesFamily: Threskiornithidae

The family Threskiornithidae includes the ibises and spoonbills. They have long, broad wings. Their bodies tend to be elongated, the neck more so, with rather long legs. The bill is also long, decurved in the case of the ibises, straight and distinctively flattened in the spoonbills. Four species have been recorded in Nevada.

White ibis, Eudocimus albus (R)
Glossy ibis, Plegadis falcinellus (R)
White-faced ibis, Plegadis chihi
Roseate spoonbill, Platalea ajaja (R)

New World vultures
Order: CathartiformesFamily: Cathartidae

The New World vultures are not closely related to Old World vultures, but superficially resemble them because of convergent evolution. Like the Old World vultures, they are scavengers, however, unlike Old World vultures, which find carcasses by sight, New World vultures have a good sense of smell with which they locate carcasses. One species has been recorded in Nevada.

Turkey vulture, Cathartes aura
California condor, Gymnogyps californianus

Osprey
Order: AccipitriformesFamily: Pandionidae

Pandionidae is a family of fish-eating birds of prey possessing a very large, powerful hooked beak for tearing flesh from their prey, strong legs, powerful talons, and keen eyesight. The family is monotypic.

Osprey, Pandion haliaetus

Hawks, eagles, and kites
Order: AccipitriformesFamily: Accipitridae

Accipitridae is a family of birds of prey, which includes hawks, eagles, kites, harriers, and Old World vultures. These birds have very large powerful hooked beaks for tearing flesh from their prey, strong legs, powerful talons, and keen eyesight. Seventeen species have been recorded in Nevada.

White-tailed kite, Elanus leucurus
Golden eagle, Aquila chrysaetos
Northern harrier, Circus hudsonius
Sharp-shinned hawk, Accipiter striatus
Cooper's hawk, Accipiter cooperii
Northern goshawk, Accipiter gentilis
Bald eagle, Haliaeetus leucocephalus
Mississippi kite, Ictinia mississippiensis (R)
Common black hawk, Buteogallus anthracinus
Harris's hawk, Parabuteo unicinctus
Red-shouldered hawk, Buteo lineatus
Broad-winged hawk, Buteo platypterus
Swainson's hawk, Buteo swainsoni
Zone-tailed hawk, Buteo albonotatus
Red-tailed hawk, Buteo jamaicensis
Rough-legged hawk, Buteo lagopus
Ferruginous hawk, Buteo regalis

Barn-owls
Order: StrigiformesFamily: Tytonidae

Barn-owls are medium to large owls with large heads and characteristic heart-shaped faces. They have long strong legs with powerful talons. One species has been recorded in Nevada.

Barn owl, Tyto alba

Owls
Order: StrigiformesFamily: Strigidae

Typical owls are small to large solitary nocturnal birds of prey. They have large forward-facing eyes and ears, a hawk-like beak, and a conspicuous circle of feathers around each eye called a facial disk. Twelve species have been recorded in Nevada.

Flammulated owl, Psiloscops flammeolus
Western screech-owl, Megascops kennicottii
Great horned owl, Bubo virginianus
Snowy owl, Bubo scandiacus (R)
Northern pygmy-owl, Glaucidium gnoma
Elf owl, Micrathene whitneyi (R)
Burrowing owl, Athene cunicularia
Spotted owl, Strix occidentalis
Barred owl, Strix varia (R)
Long-eared owl, Asio otus
Short-eared owl, Asio flammeus
Northern saw-whet owl, Aegolius acadicus

Kingfishers
Order: CoraciiformesFamily: Alcedinidae

Kingfishers are medium-sized birds with large heads, long pointed bills, short legs, and stubby tails. One species has been recorded in Nevada.

Belted kingfisher, Megaceryle alcyon

Woodpeckers
Order: PiciformesFamily: Picidae

Woodpeckers are small to medium-sized birds with chisel-like beaks, short legs, stiff tails, and long tongues used for capturing insects. Some species have feet with two toes pointing forward and two backward, while several species have only three toes. Many woodpeckers have the habit of tapping noisily on tree trunks with their beaks. Nineteen species have been recorded in Nevada.

Lewis's woodpecker, Melanerpes lewis
Red-headed woodpecker, Melanerpes erythrocephalus (R)
Acorn woodpecker, Melanerpes formicivorus
Gila woodpecker, Melanerpes uropygialis (R)
Red-bellied woodpecker, Melanerpes carolinus (R)
Williamson's sapsucker, Sphyrapicus thyroideus
Yellow-bellied sapsucker, Sphyrapicus varius
Red-naped sapsucker, Sphyrapicus nuchalis
Red-breasted sapsucker, Sphyrapicus ruber
American three-toed woodpecker, Picoides dorsalis
Black-backed woodpecker, Picoides arcticus
Downy woodpecker, Dryobates pubescens
Nuttall's woodpecker, Dryobates nuttallii (R)
Ladder-backed woodpecker, Dryobates scalaris
Hairy woodpecker, Dryobates villosus
White-headed woodpecker, Dryobates albolarvatus
Northern flicker, Colaptes auratus
Gilded flicker, Colaptes chrysoides
Pileated woodpecker, Dryocopus pileatus

Falcons and caracaras
Order: FalconiformesFamily: Falconidae

Falconidae is a family of diurnal birds of prey, notably the falcons and caracaras. They differ from hawks, eagles, and kites in that they kill with their beaks instead of their talons. Six species have been recorded in Nevada.

Crested caracara, Caracara plancus (R)
American kestrel, Falco sparverius
Merlin, Falco columbarius
Gyrfalcon, Falco rusticolus (R)
Peregrine falcon, Falco peregrinus
Prairie falcon, Falco mexicanus

Tyrant flycatchers
Order: PasseriformesFamily: Tyrannidae

Tyrant flycatchers are Passerine birds which occur throughout North and South America. They superficially resemble the Old World flycatchers, but are more robust and have stronger bills. They do not have the sophisticated vocal capabilities of the songbirds. Most, but not all, are rather plain. As the name implies, most are insectivorous. Twenty-nine species have been recorded in Nevada.

Dusky-capped flycatcher, Myiarchus tuberculifer (R)
Ash-throated flycatcher, Myiarchus cinerascens
Great crested flycatcher, Myiarchus crinitus (R)
Brown-crested flycatcher, Myiarchus tyrannulus
Sulphur-bellied flycatcher, Myiodynastes luteiventris (R)
Tropical kingbird, Tyrannus melancholicus (R)
Couch's kingbird, Tyrannus couchii (R)
Cassin's kingbird, Tyrannus vociferans
Thick-billed kingbird, Tyrannus crassirostris (R)
Western kingbird, Tyrannus verticalis
Eastern kingbird, Tyrannus tyrannus
Scissor-tailed flycatcher, Tyrannus forficatus
Fork-tailed flycatcher, Tyrannus savana (R)
Olive-sided flycatcher, Contopus cooperi
Greater pewee, Contopus pertinax (R)
Western wood-pewee, Contopus sordidulus
Eastern wood-pewee, Contopus virens (R)
Yellow-bellied flycatcher, Empidonax flaviventris (R)
Willow flycatcher, Empidonax traillii
Least flycatcher, Empidonax minimus
Hammond's flycatcher, Empidonax hammondii
Gray flycatcher, Empidonax wrightii
Dusky flycatcher, Empidonax oberholseri
Pacific-slope flycatcher, Empidonax difficilis
Cordilleran flycatcher, Empidonax occidentalis
Black phoebe, Sayornis nigricans
Eastern phoebe, Sayornis phoebe
Say's phoebe, Sayornis saya
Vermilion flycatcher, Pyrocephalus rubinus

Vireos, shrike-babblers, and erpornis
Order: PasseriformesFamily: Vireonidae

The vireos are a group of small to medium-sized passerine birds. They are typically greenish in color and resemble wood warblers apart from their heavier bills. Twelve species have been recorded in Nevada.

White-eyed vireo, Vireo griseus
Bell's vireo, Vireo bellii
Gray vireo, Vireo vicinior
Hutton's vireo, Vireo huttoni (R)
Yellow-throated vireo, Vireo flavifrons
Cassin's vireo, Vireo cassinii
Blue-headed vireo, Vireo solitarius (R)
Plumbeous vireo, Vireo plumbeus
Philadelphia vireo, Vireo philadelphicus (R)
Warbling vireo, Vireo gilvus
Red-eyed vireo, Vireo olivaceus
Yellow-green vireo, Vireo flavoviridis (R)

Shrikes
Order: PasseriformesFamily: Laniidae

Shrikes are passerine birds known for their habit of catching other birds and small animals and impaling the uneaten portions of their bodies on thorns. A shrike's beak is hooked, like that of a typical bird of prey. Two species have been recorded in Nevada.

Loggerhead shrike, Lanius ludovicianus
Northern shrike, Lanius borealis

Crows, jays, and magpies
Order: PasseriformesFamily: Corvidae

The family Corvidae includes crows, ravens, jays, choughs, magpies, treepies, nutcrackers, and ground jays. Corvids are above average in size among the Passeriformes, and some of the larger species show high levels of intelligence. Nine species have been recorded in Nevada.

Pinyon jay, Gymnorhinus cyanocephalus
Steller's jay, Cyanocitta stelleri
Blue jay, Cyanocitta cristata (R)
California scrub-jay, Aphelocoma californica
Woodhouse's scrub-jay, Aphelocoma woodhouseii
Clark's nutcracker, Nucifraga columbiana
Black-billed magpie, Pica hudsonia
American crow, Corvus brachyrhynchos
Common raven, Corvus corax

Penduline-tits
Order: PasseriformesFamily: Remizidae

The penduline-tits are a family of small passerine birds related to the true tits. One species has been recorded in Nevada.

Verdin, Auriparus flaviceps

Tits, chickadees, and titmice
Order: PasseriformesFamily: Paridae

The Paridae are mainly small stocky woodland species with short stout bills. Some have crests. They are adaptable birds, with a mixed diet including seeds and insects. Three species have been recorded in Nevada.

Black-capped chickadee, Poecile atricapilla
Mountain chickadee, Poecile gambeli
Juniper titmouse, Baeolophus ridgwayi

Larks
Order: PasseriformesFamily: Alaudidae

Larks are small terrestrial birds with often extravagant songs and display flights. Most larks are fairly dull in appearance. Their food is insects and seeds. One species has been recorded in Nevada.

Horned lark, Eremophila alpestris

Swallows
Order: PasseriformesFamily: Hirundinidae

The family Hirundinidae is adapted to aerial feeding. They have a slender streamlined body, long pointed wings, and a short bill with a wide gape. The feet are adapted to perching rather than walking, and the front toes are partially joined at the base. Seven species have been recorded in Nevada.

Bank swallow, Riparia riparia
Tree swallow, Tachycineta bicolor
Violet-green swallow, Tachycineta thalassina
Northern rough-winged swallow, Stelgidopteryx serripennis
Purple martin, Progne subis
Barn swallow, Hirundo rustica
Cliff swallow, Petrochelidon pyrrhonota

Long-tailed tits
Order: PasseriformesFamily: Aegithalidae

Long-tailed tits are a group of small passerine birds with medium to long tails. They make woven bag nests in trees. Most eat a mixed diet which includes insects. One species has been recorded in Nevada.

Bushtit, Psaltriparus minimus

Leaf warblers
Order: PasseriformesFamily: Phylloscopidae

Leaf warblers are a family of small insectivorous birds found mostly in Eurasia and ranging into Wallacea and Africa. The Arctic warbler breeds east into Alaska. The species are of various sizes, often green-plumaged above and yellow below, or more subdued with grayish-green to grayish-brown colors.

Arctic warbler/Kamchatka leaf warbler, Phylloscopus borealis/Phylloscopus examinandus (R)

Kinglets
Order: PasseriformesFamily: Regulidae

The kinglets are a small family of birds which resemble the titmice. They are very small insectivorous birds. The adults have colored crowns, giving rise to their names. Two species have been recorded in Nevada.

Ruby-crowned kinglet, Corthylio calendula
Golden-crowned kinglet, Regulus satrapa

Waxwings
Order: PasseriformesFamily: Bombycillidae

The waxwings are a group of passerine birds with soft silky plumage and unique red tips to some of the wing feathers. In the Bohemian and cedar waxwings, these tips look like sealing wax and give the group its name. These are arboreal birds of northern forests. They live on insects in summer and berries in winter. Two species have been recorded in Nevada.

Bohemian waxwing, Bombycilla garrulus
Cedar waxwing, Bombycilla cedrorum

Silky-flycatchers
Order: PasseriformesFamily: Ptiliogonatidae

The silky-flycatchers are a small family of passerine birds which occur mainly in Central America, although the range of one species extends to central California. They are related to waxwings and like that group, have soft silky plumage, usually gray or pale-yellow. They have small crests. One species has been recorded in Nevada.

Phainopepla, Phainopepla nitens

Nuthatches
Order: PasseriformesFamily: Sittidae

Nuthatches are small woodland birds. They have the unusual ability to climb down trees head first, unlike other birds which can only go upwards. Nuthatches have big heads, short tails and powerful bills and feet. Three species have been recorded in Nevada.

Red-breasted nuthatch, Sitta canadensis
White-breasted nuthatch, Sitta carolinensis
Pygmy nuthatch, Sitta pygmaea

Treecreepers
Order: PasseriformesFamily: Certhiidae

Treecreepers are small woodland birds, brown above and white below. They have thin pointed down-curved bills, which they use to extricate insects from bark. They have stiff tail feathers, like woodpeckers, which they use to support themselves on vertical trees. One species has been recorded in Nevada.

Brown creeper, Certhia americana

Gnatcatchers
Order: PasseriformesFamily: Polioptilidae

These dainty birds resemble Old World warblers in their structure and habits, moving restlessly through the foliage seeking insects. The gnatcatchers are mainly soft bluish gray in color and have the typical insectivore's long sharp bill. Many species have distinctive black head patterns (especially males) and long, regularly cocked, black-and-white tails. Two species have been recorded in Nevada.

Blue-gray gnatcatcher, Polioptila caerulea
Black-tailed gnatcatcher, Polioptila melanura

Wrens
Order: PasseriformesFamily: Troglodytidae

Wrens are small and inconspicuous birds, except for their loud songs. They have short wings and thin down-turned bills. Several species often hold their tails upright. All are insectivorous. Nine species have been recorded in Nevada.

Rock wren, Salpinctes obsoletus
Canyon wren, Catherpes mexicanus
House wren, Troglodytes aedon
Pacific wren, Troglodytes pacificus
Winter wren, Troglodytes hiemalis (R)
Sedge wren, Cistothorus platensis (R)
Marsh wren, Cistothorus palustris
Bewick's wren, Thryomanes bewickii
Cactus wren, Campylorhynchus brunneicapillus

Mockingbirds and thrashers
Order: PasseriformesFamily: Mimidae

The mimids are a family of passerine birds which includes thrashers, mockingbirds, tremblers, and the New World catbirds. These birds are notable for their vocalization, especially their remarkable ability to mimic a wide variety of birds and other sounds heard outdoors. The species tend towards dull grays and browns in their appearance. Eight species have been recorded in Nevada.

Gray catbird, Dumetella carolinensis
Curve-billed thrasher, Toxostoma curvirostre
Brown thrasher, Toxostoma rufum
Bendire's thrasher, Toxostoma bendirei
LeConte's thrasher, Toxostoma lecontei
Crissal thrasher, Toxostoma crissale
Sage thrasher, Oreoscoptes montanus
Northern mockingbird, Mimus polyglottos

Starlings
Order: PasseriformesFamily: Sturnidae

Starlings are small to medium-sized passerine birds. They are medium-sized passerines with strong feet. Their flight is strong and direct and they are very gregarious. Their preferred habitat is fairly open country, and they eat insects and fruit. Plumage is typically dark with a metallic sheen. One species has been recorded in Nevada.

European starling, Sturnus vulgaris (I)

Dippers
Order: PasseriformesFamily: Cinclidae

Dippers are small, stout, birds that feed in cold, fast moving streams. One species has been recorded in Nevada.

American dipper, Cinclus mexicanus

Thrushes and allies
Order: PasseriformesFamily: Turdidae

The thrushes are a group of passerine birds that occur mainly but not exclusively in the Old World. They are plump, soft plumaged, small to medium-sized insectivores or sometimes omnivores, often feeding on the ground. Many have attractive songs. Ten species have been recorded in Nevada.

Western bluebird, Sialia mexicana
Mountain bluebird, Sialia currucoides
Townsend's solitaire, Myadestes townsendi
Veery, Catharus fuscescens (R)
Swainson's thrush, Catharus ustulatus
Hermit thrush, Catharus guttatus
Wood thrush, Hylocichla mustelina (R)
Rufous-backed robin, Turdus rufopalliatus (R)
American robin, Turdus migratorius
Varied thrush, Ixoreus naevius

Old World sparrows
Order: PasseriformesFamily: Passeridae

Old World sparrows are small passerine birds. In general, sparrows tend to be small plump brownish or grayish birds with short tails and short powerful beaks. Sparrows are seed eaters, but they also consume small insects. One species has been recorded in Nevada.

House sparrow, Passer domesticus (I)

Wagtails and pipits
Order: PasseriformesFamily: Motacillidae

Motacillidae is a family of small passerine birds with medium to long tails. They include the wagtails, longclaws, and pipits. They are slender ground-feeding insectivores of open country. Six species have been recorded in Nevada.

Eastern yellow wagtail, Motacilla tschutschensis (R)
White wagtail, Motacilla alba (R)
Olive-backed pipit, Anthus hodgsoni (R)
Red-throated pipit, Anthus cervinus (R)
American pipit, Anthus rubescens
Sprague's pipit, Anthus spragueii (R)

Finches, euphonias, and allies
Order: PasseriformesFamily: Fringillidae

Finches are seed-eating passerine birds, that are small to moderately large and have a strong beak, usually conical and in some species very large. All have twelve tail feathers and nine primaries. These birds have a bouncing flight with alternating bouts of flapping and gliding on closed wings, and most sing well. Fifteen species have been recorded in Nevada.

Brambling, Fringilla montifringilla (R)
Evening grosbeak, Coccothraustes vespertinus
Pine grosbeak, Pinicola enucleator
Gray-crowned rosy-finch, Leucosticte tephrocotis
Black rosy-finch, Leucosticte atrata
House finch, Haemorhous mexicanus
Purple finch, Haemorhous purpureus
Cassin's finch, Haemorhous cassinii
Common redpoll, Acanthis flammea
Red crossbill, Loxia curvirostra
White-winged crossbill, Loxia leucoptera (R)
Pine siskin, Spinus pinus
Lesser goldfinch, Spinus psaltria
Lawrence's goldfinch, Spinus lawrencei
American goldfinch, Spinus tristis

Longspurs and snow buntings
Order: PasseriformesFamily: Calcariidae

The Calcariidae are a group of passerine birds that were traditionally grouped with the New World sparrows, but differ in a number of respects and are usually found in open grassy areas. Five species have been recorded in Nevada.

Lapland longspur, Calcarius lapponicus
Chestnut-collared longspur, Calcarius ornatus
Smith's longspur, Calcarius pictus (R)
Thick-billed longspur, Rhynchophanes mccownii (R)
Snow bunting, Plectrophenax nivalis (R)

New World sparrows
Order: PasseriformesFamily: Passerellidae

Until 2017, these species were considered part of the family Emberizidae. Most of the species are known as sparrows, but these birds are not closely related to the Old World sparrows which are in the family Passeridae. Many of these have distinctive head patterns. Thirty species have been recorded in Nevada.

Cassin's sparrow, Peucaea cassinii (R)
Grasshopper sparrow, Ammodramus savannarum
Black-throated sparrow, Amphispiza bilineata
Lark sparrow, Chondestes grammacus
Lark bunting, Calamospiza melanocorys
Chipping sparrow, Spizella passerina
Clay-colored sparrow, Spizella pallida
Black-chinned sparrow, Spiezella atrogularis
Field sparrow, Spizella pusilla (R)
Brewer's sparrow, Spizella breweri
Fox sparrow, Passerella iliaca
American tree sparrow, Spizelloides arborea
Dark-eyed junco, Junco hyemalis
White-crowned sparrow, Zonotrichia leucophrys
Golden-crowned sparrow, Zonotrichia atricapilla
Harris's sparrow, Zonotrichia querula
White-throated sparrow, Zonotrichia albicollis
Sagebrush sparrow, Artemisiospiza nevadensis
Bell's sparrow, Artemisiospiza belli
Vesper sparrow, Pooecetes gramineus
LeConte's sparrow, Ammospiza leconteii (R)
Baird's sparrow, Centronyx bairdii (R)
Savannah sparrow, Passerculus sandwichensis
Song sparrow, Melospiza melodia
Lincoln's sparrow, Melospiza lincolnii
Swamp sparrow, Melospiza georgiana
Abert's towhee, Melozone aberti
Rufous-crowned sparrow, Aimophila ruficeps
Green-tailed towhee, Pipilo chlorurus
Spotted towhee, Pipilo maculatus

Yellow-breasted chat
Order: PasseriformesFamily: Icteriidae

This species was historically placed in the wood-warblers (Parulidae) but nonetheless most authorities were unsure if it belonged there. It was placed in its own family in 2017.

Yellow-breasted chat, Icteria virens

Troupials and allies
Order: PasseriformesFamily: Icteridae

The icterids are a group of small to medium-sized, often colorful passerine birds restricted to the New World and include the grackles, New World blackbirds, and New World orioles. Most species have black as a predominant plumage color, often enlivened by yellow, orange, or red. Sixteen species have been recorded in Nevada.

Yellow-headed blackbird, Xanthocephalus xanthocephalus
Bobolink, Dolichonyx oryzivorus
Western meadowlark, Sturnella neglecta
Orchard oriole, Icterus spurius
Hooded oriole, Icterus cucullatus
Bullock's oriole, Icterus bullockii
Baltimore oriole, Icterus galbula
Scott's oriole, Icterus parisorum
Red-winged blackbird, Agelaius phoeniceus
Tricolored blackbird, Agelaius tricolor
Bronzed cowbird, Molothrus aeneus
Brown-headed cowbird, Molothrus ater
Rusty blackbird, Euphagus carolinus
Brewer's blackbird, Euphagus cyanocephalus
Common grackle, Quiscalus quiscula
Great-tailed grackle, Quiscalus mexicanus

New World warblers
Order: PasseriformesFamily: Parulidae

The wood warblers are a group of small often colorful passerine birds restricted to the New World. Most are arboreal, but some like the ovenbird and the two waterthrushes, are more terrestrial. Most members of this family are insectivores. Forty-four species have been recorded in Nevada.

Ovenbird, Seiurus aurocapilla
Worm-eating warbler, Helmitheros vermivorum (R)
Louisiana waterthrush, Parkesia motacilla (R)
Northern waterthrush, Parkesia noveboracensis
Golden-winged warbler, Vermivora chrysoptera (R)
Blue-winged warbler, Vermivora cyanoptera (R)
Black-and-white warbler, Mniotilta varia
Prothonotary warbler, Protonotaria citrea
Tennessee warbler, Leiothlypis peregrina
Orange-crowned warbler, Leiothlypis celata
Lucy's warbler, Leiothlypis luciae
Nashville warbler, Leiothlypis ruficapilla
Virginia's warbler, Leiothlypis virginiae
Connecticut warbler, Oporornis agilis (R)
MacGillivray's warbler, Geothlypis tolmiei
Mourning warbler, Geothlypis philadelphia (R)
Kentucky warbler, Geothlypis formosa
Common yellowthroat, Geothlypis trichas
Hooded warbler, Setophaga citrina
American redstart, Setophaga ruticilla
Cape May warbler, Setophaga tigrina (R)
Cerulean warbler, Setophaga cerulea (R)
Northern parula, Setophaga americana
Magnolia warbler, Setophaga magnolia
Bay-breasted warbler, Setophaga castanea (R)
Blackburnian warbler, Setophaga fusca
Yellow warbler, Setophaga petechia
Chestnut-sided warbler, Setophaga pensylvanica
Blackpoll warbler, Setophaga striata
Black-throated blue warbler, Setophaga caerulescens
Palm warbler, Setophaga palmarum
Pine warbler, Setophaga pinus (R)
Yellow-rumped warbler, Setophaga coronata
Yellow-throated warbler, Setophaga dominica (R)
Prairie warbler, Setophaga discolor
Grace's warbler, Setophaga graciae
Black-throated gray warbler, Setophaga nigrescens
Townsend's warbler, Setophaga townsendi
Hermit warbler, Setophaga occidentalis
Black-throated green warbler, Setophaga virens
Canada warbler, Cardellina canadensis (R)
Wilson's warbler, Cardellina pusilla
Red-faced warbler, Cardellina rubrifrons (R)
Painted redstart, Myioborus pictus

Cardinals and allies
Order: PasseriformesFamily: Cardinalidae

The cardinals are a family of robust, seed-eating birds with strong bills. They are typically associated with open woodland. The sexes usually have distinct plumages. Thirteen species have been recorded in Nevada.

Hepatic tanager, Piranga flava (R)
Summer tanager, Piranga rubra
Scarlet tanager, Piranga olivacea
Western tanager, Piranga ludoviciana
Northern cardinal, Cardinalis cardinalis (R)
Pyrrhuloxia, Cardinalis sinuatus (R)
Rose-breasted grosbeak, Pheucticus ludovicianus
Black-headed grosbeak, Pheucticus melanocephalus
Blue grosbeak, Passerina caerulea
Lazuli bunting, Passerina amoena
Indigo bunting, Passerina cyanea
Painted bunting, Passerina ciris
Dickcissel, Spiza americana

See also
List of birds
Lists of birds by region
List of North American birds

Notes

References

External links
Great Basin Bird Observatory

Nevada
Birds